Luca Ferricchio (born 7 April 1983) is an Italian-Swiss football player who plays for FC Schötz. He formerly played for SC YF Juventus and SC Cham.

See also
Football in Switzerland
List of football clubs in Switzerland

References

External links
football.ch

1983 births
Living people
Swiss men's footballers
SC Cham players
SC Kriens players
SC Young Fellows Juventus players
Association football defenders